Fleur Ezekiel is an Indian model who was crowned Eve's Weekly Miss India 1959 and represented India at Miss World 1959. She was the first winner of Eve's Weekly Miss India pageant. She was Indian of Jewish ancestry, descending from a Bene Israel family. She has one younger brother, Noel Ezekiel. She was an Indian pioneer who brought India into the spotlight after becoming the first Indian to participate in Miss World.

References

Bene Israel
Femina Miss India winners
Female models from Maharashtra
Jewish female models
Living people
Year of birth missing (living people)
Indian Jews
Miss World 1959 delegates